The men's 1500 metres at the 2011 IPC Athletics World Championships is held at the QEII Stadium on 22–27, and 29 January

In the classification T37 event, there were only two competitors, so even though Irelands Michael McKillop set a World Record, he did not receive a medal, as there must be a minimum of three competitors.

Medalists

T11

T12

T13

T20

T36

T37
The Men's 1500 metres, T37 was held on January 26

T37 = spasticity in an arm and leg on one side of the body, good functional ability on the other side.

Results

Final

Splits

T46

T52
The Men's 1500 metres, T52 was held on January 22

T52 = good shoulder, elbow and wrist function, poor to normal finger flexion and extension, no trunk or leg function

Results

Final

Splits

T54
The Men's 1500 metres, T54 was held on January 25 and 26

T54 = normal upper limb function, partial to normal trunk function, may have significant function of the lower limbs.

Results

Heats
Qualification: First 3 in each heat(Q) and the next 1 fastest(q) advance to the final.

Final

Splits

See also
2011 IPC Athletics World Championships – Men's pentathlon
List of IPC world records in athletics

References
General
Complete Results Book from the 2011 IPC Athletics World Championships
Schedule and results, Official site of the 2011 IPC Athletics World Championships
IPC Athletics Classification Explained, Scottish Disability Sport
Specific

External links
ParalympicSport.TV on YouTube
2011 IPC Athletics World Championships: Men's 1500m T20
2011 IPC Athletics World Championships: Men's 1500m T52

1500 metres
1500 metres at the World Para Athletics Championships